Basantia is a census town and gram panchayat in Deshapran CD block in Contai subdivision of Purba Medinipur district in the state of West Bengal, India.

Geography

Location

Urbanisation
93.55% of the population of Contai subdivision live in the rural areas. Only 6.45% of the population live in the urban areas and it is considerably behind Haldia subdivision in urbanization, where 20.81% of the population live in urban areas.

Note: The map alongside presents some of the notable locations in the subdivision. All places marked in the map are linked in the larger full screen map.

Demographics
As per 2011 Census of India Basantia had a total population of 5,455 of which 2,843 (52%) were males and 2,612 (48%) were females. Population below 6 years was 700. The total number of literates in Basantia was 3,749 (78.84% of the population over 6 years).

Infrastructure
As per the District Census Handbook 2011, Basantia covered an area of 1.3479 km2.  It had the facility of a railway station at Contai 12 km away and bus routes in the town. Amongst the civic amenities it had 100 road lighting points and 1,120 domestic electric connections. Amongst the medical facilities it had a hospital and 8 medicine shops in the town. Amongst the educational facilities it had were 2 primary schools, 2 secondary schools and a senior secondary school. The nearest degree college was at Contai.

Transport
Basantia is on Contai-Basantia-Benichak-Rasulpur Road.

Education
Basantia High School is a coeducational higher secondary school.

Daruya Gandhi Smriti High School is a Bengali-medium coeducational school established in 1972.

Healthcare
Basantia Rural Hospital at Basantia (with 30 beds) is the main medical facility in Deshapran CD block. There are primary health centres at Barabantalia (with 15 beds) and Daulatpur, PO Dariapur (with 10 beds).

References

Cities and towns in Purba Medinipur district